Kallo.ng (Hausa language, viewing, watching, looking) is a Nigerian Hausa-language subscription streaming service based in Kano State. Launched on November 26, 2021, it is the first streaming platform to offer programming solely in Hausa. The platform is owned by Spacekraft Media Limited, which was founded in 2021 by Maijidda Shehu Modibbo. In an interview, Moddibo said the platform garnered 35,000 subscribers within eight months of its launch.

The Nigerian federal government says it is planning regulations for streaming and content providers such as Kallo and Netflix, worried that they can be used to “cause chaos” and undermine Nigeria's democratic processes.

Awards
On July 5, 2022, Kallo.ng received the Best New Streaming Innovation award, presented by the Marketing World Awards in Accra, Ghana.

See also
 List of streaming media services

References

External links
 – official site

Android (operating system) software
Entertainment companies established in 2021
Internet properties established in 2021
Internet television streaming services
Mass media companies established in 2021
Video rental services
Subscription video on demand services
Hausa-language mass media